Greenside Colliery is a town in the Emalahleni Local Municipality of the Nkangala District Municipality in the Mpumalanga Province of South Africa. Numerous former mines are located in Greenside Colliery from when mining was the largest industry.

As of the 2011 census, Greenside Colliery had 428 households.

See also
 List of populated places in South Africa

References 

Populated places in the Emalahleni Local Municipality, Mpumalanga